First 4 Figures is a United Kingdom and Hong Kong-based toy and model company. First 4 Figures produces merchandise statues of well-known  licenses, such as The Legend of Zelda, Super Mario, Metroid and Sonic the Hedgehog.

History 
First 4 Figures was established in 2003 to produce high quality officially licensed resin collectables. After acquiring the worldwide WWE resin statue license in 2003, First 4 Figures was dedicated to bring the industry's newest and most innovative statues to the market. Since then, First 4 Figures has gone on to expand its license portfolio to include Magic: The Gathering and Transformers along with other high-profile licenses. Early 2006, First 4 Figures announced an agreement with Nintendo to produce statues for some of their franchises, such as The Legend of Zelda and Metroid. In October 2006 they announced the license for 2000AD to produce a set of collectibles. In early 2008, they announced classic Sonic the Hedgehog line and in early 2012 they announced their first statue from modern Sonic the Hedgehog line.

Products 
Besides normal character statues, First 4 Figures also produces busts, replica weapons and diorama statues. All of the statues are limited in quantity and usually are not being produced for the second time after being sold out. Most of the figures available in 2 versions:
 Regular - produced in a quantity between 5000 - 2000 pcs and doesn't have any additional features. Can bought at Amazon.com and several other shops in addition to First 4 Figures website.
 Exclusive - produced in a quantity between 200 - 750 pcs and have lighted parts (usually base) which is powered by 2, 3 or 4 AA batteries. Can be bought only at First 4 Figures website.

All figures come with a Certificate of Authenticity which allows buyer to get next statues in the series with the same number as first one.
Some of the statues (like "20th Anniversary Sonic") is not available for purchase from First 4 Figures and can only be obtained from various events or contests. Those statues usually doesn't have Certificate of Authenticity included.

Licences 
First 4 Figures has acquired several licences to produce statues of characters from the following franchises:
 Magic: The Gathering
 Transformers
 G.I. Joe
 Doom the Movie
 World Wrestling Entertainment (WWE)
 The Legend of Zelda
 Metroid
 Assassin's Creed
 Sonic the Hedgehog

References

External links 
 

Toy companies of the United Kingdom